Wittrockia tenuisepala is a plant species in the genus Wittrockia.

This bromeliad is endemic to the Atlantic Forest biome (Mata Atlantica Brasileira) within Minas Gerais state, located in southeastern Brazil.

References

tenuisepala
Endemic flora of Brazil
Flora of the Atlantic Forest
Flora of Minas Gerais